The Intruder is a 1933 Pre code comedy crime film directed by Albert Ray and starring Monte Blue and Lila Lee, two silent screen veterans.  The cast also featured Gwen Lee, Arthur Housman and Mischa Auer. Shot at the RKO-Pathé Studios in California, it was produced and distributed by the Poverty Row studio Allied Pictures. The picture survives in the Library of Congress collection.

Synopsis
When one of the passengers is murdered on a ship during a tropical storm, a man named Samson declares himself to be a police detective from San Francisco takes over the investigation. This is interrupted when the ship is wrecked and the passengers and crew are forced to take shelter on a seemingly deserted island. Further deaths and unexplained events take place before they are rescued by a French ship.

Cast
Monte Blue as Jack Brandt
Lila Lee as Connie Wayne
Gwen Lee as Daisy
Arthur Housman as Reggie Wayne
Mischa Auer as  Wild Man
Harry Cording as Cramer
William B. Davidson as Samson
Wilfred Lucas as Mr. Wayne
Sidney Bracey as Carlo, The Valet
Lynton Brent as Purser
Jack Beek as Hanson
Allen Cavan as Captain Rush
 Gordon De Main as Doctor 
 Grace Hayle as Ship Passenger

References

Bibliography
 Pitts, Michael R. Poverty Row Studios, 1929–1940. McFarland & Company, 2005.

External links

1933 films
Films directed by Albert Ray
1933 mystery films
American mystery films
American black-and-white films
Seafaring films
1930s English-language films
1930s American films